Kankarbagh, or Kankarbagh Colony, is a neighborhood and residential area in Patna, Bihar, India. It is one of the largest colonies of Asia, and in terms of population, it is the second largest.

Overview
Established back in 1916, Kankarbagh is spread over an area of around 900 acres. It stretches roughly from Panch Shiv Mandir in the west to Kumhrar in the East. The word Kankarbagh means 'garden of kankar' (stone chips).

Transport and connectivity
Kankarbagh is well connected to the main areas of Patna by mini buses. Auto-rickshaw and cycle rickshaw are available most of the time.

Rajendra Nagar Terminal, one of the city's important railway stations, and Patna's busiest railway station Patna Junction, are less than a kilometer away from Kankarbagh. Patna Airport is located about 8.65 km from the Kankarbagh More. The Patliputra bus stand Patna is located about 6.5 km from Kankarbagh.

Patliputra Sports Complex

The Patliputra Sports Complex (formally Kankarbagh Sports Complex) is a sports stadium in Kankarbagh. The Patliputra Sporting Complex was also known as Rainbow Field before construction of the sport complex.

The complex is fully equipped with facilities for both outdoor and indoor games. Football, hockey, kabaddi, table tennis, carrom, swimming, wrestling, and taekwondo are some of the games organised here.

Since the inception of Pro Kabaddi League in 2014, the stadium has played host to the Home matches of Patna Pirates (winners of the 2016 Pro Kabaddi League season (January) and 2016 Pro Kabaddi League season (June)).

The 31st National Taekwondo Championship, the 75th Senior National Table Tennis Championship and multiple junior Basketball and Tennis competitions have been hosted by the stadium.

Kumhrar Park

Kumhrar, or Kumrahar, is the remains of an ancient city of Pataliputra, which is located 5 km east from Patna Junction railway station on Kankarbagh Main Road.

Archaeological remains from the Mauryan period (322–185 BCE) have been discovered here, including the ruins of a hypostyle 80-pillared hall. The excavation finds date back to 600 BCE, and mark the ancient capital of Ajatashatru, Chandragupta and Ashoka; collectively the relics range from four continuous periods from 600 BCE to 600 CE.

Police stations
The following police stations of the Patna Police serve this area:
Kankarbagh Police Station
Patrakar Nagar Police Station
Agamkuan Police Station
Ramkrishna Nagar Police Station

Notable people
Sushil Kumar Modi, politician
Ishan Kishan, cricketer
Jagdish Sharma, politician
Bilat Paswan Vihangam, writer and politician
Arun Kumar Sinha, MLA Kumharar
Nitin Nabin, MLA Bankipur
Rahul Sharma (Bihar politician), politician
Rajiv Ranjan Prasad, politician
Suman Mallick, politician

References

Neighbourhoods in Patna